Erik Derycke may refer to:

Erik Derycke (politician) (born 1949), Belgian judge and politician
Erik Derycke (quiz player) (born 1970), Belgian quiz player